Peace is the debut album by American rock band Vista Chino, featuring three former members of Kyuss (Brant Bjork, Nick Oliveri and John Garcia), along with new guitarist Bruno Fevery. The album was released on September 3, 2013.

The album peaked at No. 14 on the Billboard Heatseekers Album chart.

Background
Originally known as Kyuss Lives!, the band changed their name after a lawsuit from Josh Homme and Scott Reeder prevented them from using the Kyuss Lives! name for recordings.

Guest appearances on Peace include Mike Dean of Corrosion of Conformity and former Kyuss bassist Chris Cockrell who appear on one track each.

Napalm Records released the record on 2xLP in colored versions of red, green, blue, orange, gold, bone and black, along with a limited edition digipak version of the CD featuring two bonus tracks.

Music videos were made for the songs 'Sweet Remain' and 'Barcelonian'.

Reception

The Aquarian praised the album saying, "Peace not only captures much of what was so groundbreaking in Kyuss' approach, but expands the scope and gives a modern impression."

East Bay Express proclaimed "The dynamism between meandering, clean passages and desperately surging crunch is the best I've heard in a while."

Spin noted "Garcia and Bjork still have that Kyuss character in spades on their debut, Peace, writing bulldozing stoner anthems that live up to the legend of their former band."

Magnet Magazine placed Peace No. 1 on their best hard rock albums of 2013.

Brave Words & Bloody Knuckles writer Greg Prato selected "Peace" as No. 6 for his Top 10 of 2013 for "The Scribes Speak" poll.

Track listing

Personnel

Credits adapted from the album's liner notes.

Vista Chino
John Garcia – vocals
Bruno Fevery – guitar
Nick Oliveri – bass
Brant Bjork – drums, percussion, backing vocals, lead vocals on "Planet 1", bass on "Planets 1 & 2"

Guest musicians
Mike Dean – bass on "As You Wish" 
Tom Brayton – additional percussion
Chris Cockrell (Vic Du Monte) – harmonica on "The Gambling Moose"

Production
Brant Bjork – production
Harper Hug and Trevor Whatever – engineering/mixing
Adrian Medel – assistant engineer 
J.J. Golden – mastering
The Date Farmers, Carlos Ramirez, and Armando Lerma – album artwork
Alex Rauch – layout editing
Richard Sibbald – photography

Charts

References

2013 debut albums
Vista Chino albums
Napalm Records albums